José Manuel Gallegos (October 30, 1815 – April 21, 1875) was a delegate to the US Congress from the Territory of New Mexico.

Biography 
Born in Abiquiú, in what is now Rio Arriba County, New Mexico, Gallegos attended parochial schools.  He studied theology at the Jesuit run College of Durango (Colegio de Durango), Republic of Mexico, graduated in 1840, and was ordained a Roman Catholic priest.  He served as member of the legislative assembly of what was then the territory of Santa Fe de Nuevo México, Republic of Mexico, from 1843 to 1846.  He served as member of the first territorial council of the Territory of New Mexico in 1851.

Gallegos was elected as a Democrat to the Thirty-third US Congress (March 4, 1853 – March 3, 1855). He was elected to a second term but served only briefly, March 4, 1855, to July 23, 1856, as he was succeeded by Miguel Antonio Otero (I), who had successfully contested Gallegos's election.  He served as member of the territorial house of representatives 1860-1862 and served as speaker. He was an unsuccessful candidate for election in 1862 to the Thirty-eighth US Congress.

In 1862, Gallegos was made a prisoner of war by the Texas Confederate troops when they came through Santa Fe. He served as Treasurer of the New Mexico Territory in 1865 and 1866, and as Superintendent of Indian Affairs in New Mexico in 1868.

Gallegos was elected as a Democrat to the Forty-second US Congress (March 4, 1871 – March 3, 1873). At the time he did not speak English and asked to be permitted a translator on the Floor of the House of Representatives, this request was denied. He was an unsuccessful candidate for reelection in 1872 to the Forty-third US Congress.  He died in Santa Fe, and was interred there in the Catholic Cemetery.

See also

Santacafé - a Santa Fe restaurant housed in Gallego's historic home
List of Hispanic Americans in the United States Congress

References

Further reading

External links
"Hispanic Americans in Congress, 1822-1995: José Manuel Gallegos" Library of Congress

1815 births
1875 deaths
Members of the New Mexico Territorial Legislature
Delegates to the United States House of Representatives from New Mexico Territory
American people of Galician descent
American Civil War prisoners of war
Hispanic and Latino American members of the United States Congress
Neomexicanos
New Mexico Democrats
19th-century American politicians
People from Abiquiú, New Mexico
Catholics from New Mexico
Members of the United States House of Representatives removed by contest
19th-century American Roman Catholic priests